Rugby World Cup qualification is a process that determines which nations will compete at the Rugby World Cup, a men's rugby union competition.

Unlike previous tournaments (where eight teams, the quarter-finalists from the preceding World Cup, qualified automatically and twelve places were available through qualification) the 2011 World Cup will be contested by twelve automatic qualifiers / seeds (the teams who finished in the top three of the groups at the 2007 World Cup) and eight qualifiers.

The qualification system for the remaining eight places will be region-based with Europe and the Americas allocated two qualifying places, Africa, Asia and Oceania one place each, with the last place determined by a play-off.

History
The first Rugby World Cup, the tournament of 1987 held no qualifying tournament. Instead, all the then members of the International Rugby Board (then, IFRB) were automatically included in the competition. These members accounted for seven of the 16 available positions. The remaining positions were filled by invitation.

The next tournament, the 1991 Rugby World Cup implemented a qualifying process. Eight of the 16 available positions were filled by nations automatically, however, the remaining positions would be determined by a 25 nation qualifying tournament. The following tournament, the 1995 Rugby World Cup, increased the qualifying tournament to 43 nations.  In addition to the eight previous quarterfinalists, hosts South Africa were granted automatic entry.

The approach changed again for the 1999 Rugby World Cup, as only the hosts and the defending champions, the runners-up, the third place play-off winners from the 1995 cup were to gain automatic entry, as opposed to the elite eight nations. The 1999 world cup also saw the introduction of a repechage, a second chance for teams that had finished runners-up in each qualifying zone. Again, the number of nations participating in the qualifying events increased, from 43 to 63.

81 teams entered qualifying for the 2003 Rugby World Cup. The eight quarter-finalists from the previous world cup gained automatic qualification with another twelve berths open to qualifiers. Teams from five continents, Africa, Asia, Oceania, Europe and the Americas gained entry to the competition. Qualification came through a mixture of round robin tournaments, knockout and repechage.

A similar mixture of round robin tournaments, knockout and repechage was used for the qualification for the 2007 Rugby World Cup involving 86 teams, which together with the 8 teams which have qualified automatically brought to 94 the total number of teams participating in the 2007 tournament.

In addition to the eight quarterfinalists at the 2007 Rugby World Cup, the four teams finishing in third place in their respective pools qualified automatically for the 2011 Rugby World Cup.  Various existing regional tournaments were incorporated into the qualification process for the remaining eight berths.  Including teams that failed to qualify for official qualifying tournaments, 88 teams participated in the qualification process, bringing the total number of teams participating in the 2011 tournament to 100.

Qualification competition entrants over time

1 There was no qualifying process to the 1987 World Cup. The at the time eight IRFB members (minus South Africa boycotted because of apartheid) were joined by nine invited nations.

Qualification berths by continent

2 There was no qualifying process to the 1987 World Cup; all teams were invited, and, therefore, automatically qualified.
3 A+R indicates that one of the teams of this continent qualified to the World Cup through the repechage (called Final Qualification Tournament for the 2023 Rugby World Cup).
4 A+P indicates that one of the teams of this continent qualified to the World Cup through the 2019 Rugby World Cup – play-off qualifications or through the 2023 Rugby World Cup – Asia/Pacific play-off.

First appearance in qualification by team

Teams marked in italics had appeared in a previous world cup (by invitation in 1987 and automatically thereafter). France, New Zealand, and South Africa have never needed to take part in the qualifying tournaments, having been invited to their first tournament and always qualifying automatically thereafter.

4 Took part in the African qualifying tournament.
5 First appearance as Czech Republic; previous appearance as Czechoslovakia.
6 First appearance as Germany; previous appearance as West Germany.
7 Withdrew prior to the competition. Actually took part in the 2003 qualifying tournament.
8 First appearance as Chinese Taipei; previous appearance as Taiwan.
9 First appearance as Federal Republic of Yugoslavia; previous appearances as Socialist Federal Republic of Yugoslavia.
10 First appearance as Serbia; previous appearances as Federal Republic of Yugoslavia and Socialist Federal Republic of Yugoslavia.
11 First appearance as United Arab Emirates.  Previously competed as part of Arabian Gulf
12 Although Cyprus were originally included in the qualifying process, they were later removed as they were not full member of the IRB.

Qualification by continent

Africa

Americas

Asia

Europe

Oceania

Repechage results
The repechage, a second chance for teams that had finished runners-up in each qualifying zone, has been a feature of qualifying since it was introduced during qualifying for the 1999 Rugby World Cup. The following table shows which teams have participated in the repechage – both the teams that have qualified via the repechage, and the teams that have failed to qualify via the repechage.

Note: All scores marked with an asterisk (*) are aggregate scores over two legs.

2011 qualifying format

Automatic qualification
Unlike recent tournaments (where all eight quarter-finalists from the previous tournament automatically qualified for the subsequent world cup) automatic qualification for the 2011 World Cup was awarded to the twelve teams which finished in the top three of each of the 2007 World Cup groups (pools).

Qualification for 2011
Seven of the eight qualifying berths were given out as follows: two berths each for Europe and Americas and one each for Asia, Africa and Oceania. The final spot was determined by the winner of a playoff, that included the third place teams from the American and European qualifying tournaments and the second place teams from the African and Asian qualifying tournaments.

See also
 National team appearances in the Rugby World Cup

References

External links

 Rugby World Cup official website

 
Qualification